Peter Gill (born 7 September, 1939) is a Welsh theatre director, playwright, and actor. He was born in Cardiff to George John and  Margaret Mary (née Browne) Gill, and educated at St Illtyd's College, Cardiff.

Career
An actor from 1957–65, he directed his first production without décor, at the Royal Court Theatre in August 1965, A Collier's Friday Night by D. H. Lawrence. Having begun his career as an actor, he is now best known for his work as a director and playwright.

Royal Court
In 1964, he became Assistant Director at the Royal Court and Associate Director in 1970, best known there as the director of three hitherto under-rated plays by D. H. Lawrence, presented as a group in 1968. In 1969, the Royal Court also presented two of his own first plays, The Sleepers' Den and Over Gardens Out, "which revealed that Gill could evoke with the economy of means and lyrical skill the circumstances of his Cardiff boyhood."

Riverside Studios
Gill was appointed artistic director of the Riverside Studios in 1976, and on 30 May, 1976, his Nottingham/Edinburgh production of As You Like It (starring Jane Lapotaire as Rosalind, John Price as Orlando and Zoë Wanamaker as Celia, with a stage design by William Dudley) marked the official opening of the Hammersmith arts centre, formerly television studios. His first Riverside production was a staging of his own version of Chekhov's The Cherry Orchard, which opened to press acclaim on 12 January, 1978 (starring Judy Parfitt as Ranevskaya and Julie Covington as Varya, again with a setting designed by William Dudley).

Writing for The Sunday Times, theatre critic Bernard Levin said: 
It is good to salute the opening of a new theatre; it is thrice good to be able to do so with almost unqualified praise for its first production. At the Riverside Studios, Peter Gill (who is in charge of the whole enterprise) has directed The Cherry Orchard with a cast so astonishingly suitable that I began, hallucinatorily, to believe that they had been assembled first, and that Chekhov had then written the play round them. What is more, they are achieving this effect on an impossible stage; it is seventy-five feet wide (the players have to sprint, never mind run, if they are to get off at all), absurdly shallow, and lacking even the most rudimentary trappings in the way of flies, a thrust or even wings.... Mr. Gill and his cast have sought success in the only place it can be found: inside themselves and the play. The effect is magical; The Cherry Orchard has almost never, in my experience, been at once so harrowing and so glittering; nor its fragile rhythms so finely, surely spun, its development so natural, human and real.

When Gill left Riverside in 1980 to be an Associate Director at the National Theatre, a West London theatre critic John Thaxter wrote:
It is no exaggeration to say that Gill's four years as director have taken Riverside to a leading position in British theatre; both with his own productions (notably The Cherry Orchard and this year's Julius Caesar) and as a generous host to world theatre giants: Tadeusz Kantor and Athol Fugard among them....It would also be fair to say that the major portion of the subsidies making all this possible came from the Hammersmith Council, which this year alone provided £200,000 to Riverside, although its audience is drawn from far and wide.

National Theatre
As an Associate Director of the National Theatre from 1980 to 1997, Gill also founded the National Theatre Studio in 1984, which he ran until 1 October, 1990. In his own words:
When I set up the National Theatre Studio the development and analysis of acting was a central part of the work, so that, along with commissioning writers, developing directors and designers, investigating non-text based work, and producing work for the main house, the practice and analysis of acting skills seemed an essential part of any programme of work that was in part concerned with process.

Filmography

Plays
Plays include:
The Sleepers Den, 1965; Royal Court, November 1969
Over Gardens Out, Royal Court, November 1969
Small Change, Royal Court, February 1976
Kick for Touch, National Theatre, February 1983
In the Blue. National Theatre, November 1985
Mean Tears, National Theatre, July 1987
Cardiff East, National Theatre, February 1997
The Look Across the Eyes, published 1997
Certain Young Men, Almeida Theatre, January 1999
Friendly Fire, Crucible Youth Theatre, Sheffield, June 2002
Lovely Evening, Theatre 503, March 2005
The York Realist, Royal Court, 2002; revived at the Donmar Warehouse and Sheffield Crucible, 2018
Original Sin, Crucible Sheffield, 2002
Another Door Closed, Theatre Royal, Bath, 2009
Versailles, Donmar Warehouse, 2014
As Good A Time As Any, Print Room, 2015

Adaptations and versions:
A Provincial Life (Chekhov), Royal Court, 1966
The Merry-Go-Round (D. H. Lawrence), Royal Court, 1973
The Cherry Orchard (Chekhov), Riverside Studios, 1978
Touch and Go (D. H. Lawrence), Riverside Studios, 1980
As I Lay Dying (William Faulkner), National Theatre, 1985
Uncle Vanya (Chekhov), Theatr-Clwyd Mold & Crucible Studio Sheffield, 2017

As director

Royal Court
A Collier's Friday Night (D. H. Lawrence), August 1965
The Local Stigmatic (Heathcote Williams), March 1966
The Ruffian on the Stair (Joe Orton), August 1966
A Provincial Life (Chekhov ad. Gill), October 1966
The Soldier's Fortune (Thomas Otway), January 1967
The Daughter-in-Law (D. H. Lawrence), March 1967. First prize at the Belgrade International Theatre Festival, 1968
The Widowing of Mrs Holroyd (D. H. Lawrence), March 1968
Life Price (Jeremy Seabrook and Michael O'Neill), January 1969
The Sleepers' Den (Gill), November 1969
Over Gardens Out  (Gill), November 1969
The Duchess of Malfi (John Webster), May 1972
Crete and Sergeant Pepper (John Antrobus), May 1972
The Merry-Go-Round (D. H. Lawrence ad. Gill), November 1973
The Fool (Edward Bond), November 1975
Small Change (Gill), July 1976
The York Realist (Gill), English Touring Theatre, January 2002

Riverside Studios
As You Like It, Nottingham and Edinburgh production: opening production at Riverside Studios, 30 May 1976
The Cherry Orchard (Chekhov, ad. Gill), January 1978
The Changeling (Thomas Middleton and William Rowley), September 1978
Measure for Measure (Shakespeare), May 1979
Julius Caesar (Shakespeare), May 1980
Scrape Off the Black (Tunde Ikoli), July 1980
Touch and Go (D. H. Lawrence), rehearsed reading October 1980, to mark the 50th anniversary of the author's death

National Theatre
A Month in the Country (Turgenev), Olivier, February 1981
Don Juan by Molière, Cottesloe, April 1981
Much Ado About Nothing, Olivier, August 1981
Danton's Death (Georg Büchner), Olivier, July 1982
Major Barbara (G B Shaw), Lyttelton, October 1982
Kick for Touch (Gill), Cottesloe, February 1983
Small Change (Gill), Cottesloe, February 1983
Tales from Hollywood (Christopher Hampton), Olivier, September 1983
Antigone by Sophocles, Cottesloe, October 1983
Venice Preserv'd by Thomas Otway, Lyttelton, April 1984
Fool for Love by Sam Shepard, Cottesloe, October 1984
As I Lay Dying by William Faulkner, adapted by Peter Gill, Cottesloe, October 1985
Five Play Bill, Cottesloe, November 1985, including In the Blue (Gill)
Mean Tears (Gill), Cottesloe, July 1987
Mrs Klein by Nicholas Wright, Cottesloe, August 1988
Juno and the Paycock by Seán O'Casey, Lyttelton, February 1989
Cardiff East (Gill), February 1997
Luther (John Osborne), Olivier, October 2001
Scenes from the Big Picture (Owen McCafferty), Cottesloe, April 2003 
The Voysey Inheritance by Harley Granville-Barker, Lyttelton, April 2006

Other venues
O'Flaherty V.C. by Bernard Shaw, Mermaid Theatre, September 1966
Crimes of Passion and June Evening (tour), 1967
Life Price and Much Ado About Nothing, Stratford, Connecticut, 1969
Landscape and Silence by Harold Pinter, Lincoln Center's Forum Theater, 1970
Hedda Gabler by Ibsen, Stratford, Ontario, Canada 1970
Cato Street, Young Vic,1971
Crete and Sergeant Pepper and Midsummer Night's Dream, Zurich, 1972
The Daughter-in-Law, Bochum, 1972
Twelfth Night, RSC Stratford. August 1974, Aldwych Theatre, February 1975
As You Like It, Nottingham Playhouse, Edinburgh Festival 1975; and the opening of Riverside Studios, 30 May 1976
The Way of the World by William Congreve, Lyric Hammersmith, October 1992
New England (Richard Nelson), RSC The Pit, November 1994
Uncle Vanya (Chekhov) for Field Day, Tricycle Theatre, April 1995
A Patriot for Me (John Osborne), RSC Barbican Theatre, October 1995
Tongue of a Bird (Ellen McLaughlin), Almeida Theatre, November 1997
Certain Young Men (Gill), Almeida Theatre. January 1999
The Seagull by Chekhov, adapted by Gill, RSC Swan Theatre, Stratford, February 2000; Barbican Theatre, April 2000
Speed-the-Plow by David Mamet, New Ambassadors Theatre, March 2000; Duke of York's Theatre, June 2000
The York Realist (Gill) for English Touring Theatre at the Royal Court, January 2002 ; Strand Theatre, March 2002
Original Sin (Gill), Crucible Theatre, Sheffield, June 2002
Days of Wine and Roses by J P Miller adapted by Owen McCafferty, Donmar Warehouse, February 2005 
Epitaph for George Dillon by John Osborne and Anthony Creighton, Comedy Theatre, September 2005 
Gaslight by Patrick Hamilton, Old Vic, June 2007 
The Importance of Being Earnest by Oscar Wilde, Theatre Royal Bath and UK Tour 2007; followed by Vaudeville Theatre, 2008
Another Door Closed by Peter Gill, Theatre Royal, Bath, 2009

Private life
He lived from the 1960s until 2006 in a small flat in the Thameside house formerly belonging to George Devine and later bought by playwright Donald Howarth and his civil partner George Goetschuis. Gill gets several mentions in the diaries of Joe Orton, for whom he directed a double bill of former television plays by Orton at the Royal Court called Crimes of Passion. 

In 2007, the British Library acquired Peter Gill's papers and supplementary papers consisting of literary works, theatre administration and correspondence. National Life Stories conducted an oral history interview (C1316/08) with Peter Gill in 2008-2009 for its The Legacy of the English Stage Company collection held by the British Library.

Sources
To Bodies Gone: The Theatre of Peter Gill, by Barney Norris, Seren Books (2014); 
Who's Who in the Theatre, 17th Edition, Gale (1981); 
The National: The Theatre and its Work 1963–1997 by Simon Callow, Nick Hern Books (1997); 
At the Royal Court: 25 Years of the English Stage Company, ed. Richard Findlater, Amber Lane Press (1981); 
Actors Speaking with an introduction by Peter Gill, edited by Lyn Haill, Oberon Books (2007);

References

External links
 Peter Gill's website
 Recent publications by Peter Gill

1939 births
Writers from Cardiff
Living people
Welsh dramatists and playwrights
Welsh male actors
Welsh theatre directors